Maulvi Mohammad Zakaullah or Munshi Zakaullah (20 April 1832–7 November 1910) was a British Indian Urdu writer and translator. He wrote Tarikh-e-Hindustan, a fourteen-volume compilation of Indian history in Urdu.

Early life and education
Zakaullah was born on 20 April 1832 in Delhi. His father Mohammad Sanaullah was the tutor of one of the princes in the Mughal courts. He commended his studies under his grand father Hafiz Mohammad Bakaullah and got his education in the Delhi College under professor Ramchundra, who was a distinct mathematical teacher. His other teachers include Mamluk Ali Nanautawi.

Career

He started his service as a scholar at the Delhi College and continued to serve in the education department till he was 55. At Delhi College he also headed the Vernacular Translation Society in translating texts in western sciences, history and philosophy into Urdu. In 1855 he was appointed Deputy Inspector of Schools of Bulandshahar and Muradabad. In 1866 he was then appointed the head master for the Normal School in Delhi. He was then transferred to the Muir Central College in Allahabad in 1872 to teach western science in the medium of urdu. He retired on pension from Allahabad in 1877. Shortly before his retirement he was awarded the title of Khan Bahadur and Shams-ul-Ulema. After his retirement he spent some time in Aligarh working for the literary movement of Sir Syed Ahmad Khan and his friend Maulvi Samiullah. He was an early supporter of the Aligarh Movement and translated works for Scientific Society along with his contemporaries Maulvi Nazir Ahmad and Altaf Hussain Hali.

He died at the age of 78 on 7 November 1910 at Delhi. He was survived by his son Inayatullah Delhvi who was also an Urdu writer and translator.

Literary work
The literary work of Maulvi Zakaullah include.
 Aain-e-Qaisari
 Falsafa-e-Imsal aur Mauntakh-ul-Imsal
 Iqbalnama-e-Akabari
 Karzan Nama
 Mabadiul Insha
 Mahasin-ul-Akhlaq
 Makarim-ul-Akhlaq
 Musalman Aur Science
 Risala Majalis-e-Munazira
 Risala Taqvim-ul-Lisan
 Sawaneh Umari
 Taqveem-ul-Lisan
 Tareekh-e-Hindustan
 Tareekh-e-Arooz Ahd-e-Saltanat Englishia Hind

References

Further reading
 
 Famous Urdu Poets and Writers, Abdul Qadir, 1947

1832 births
1910 deaths
Urdu-language writers